Lahellefjord is a minor fjord-arm in the Tønsbergfjord in Sandefjord, Norway. It stretches from Natholmen Island to its base at Lahelle. The Lahellefjord is 5 kilometers long, and is one of four fjords located in Sandefjord.

Islands and islets include Natholmen (by its mouth), Faraholmen, Trondskjær, Rauern, Marøyskjæra, and Møyern.

References

Fjords of Vestfold og Telemark
Sandefjord